Biathlon at the 2017 Winter Universiade was held in Alatau Cross-Country Skiing & Biathlon Complex, Almaty from 31 January to 7 February 2017.

Men's events

Women's events

Mixed events

Medal table

References

External links
Biathlon at the 2017 Winter Universiade.
Results book

 
Biathlon
2017
Winter Universiade
2017 Winter Universiade